Ali Sami Yachir (born January 2, 1985) is an Algerian football player who plays for ASO Chlef in the Algerian Ligue Professionnelle 2.

In September 2013, a video of a miss by Yachir in a league match against CR Belouizdad went viral. The striker failed to score into an empty net after the goalkeeper had tripped over the ball.

Honours
MC Alger
 Algerian Cup: 2014
 Algerian Super Cup: 2014

References

1985 births
Algerian footballers
Algerian Ligue Professionnelle 1 players
ASO Chlef players
French sportspeople of Algerian descent
Ligue 1 players
Ligue 2 players
Living people
MC Alger players
Montpellier HSC players
Footballers from Tizi Ouzou
RC Strasbourg Alsace players
Stade Malherbe Caen players
Stade de Reims players
USM El Harrach players
Association football forwards